Matthaios Kamariotis (died 1490) was a Greek scholar of the Renaissance era, from Thessaloniki. He was a lecturer at the University of Constantinople and the first director of the Patriarchal Academy of Constantinople (Phanar Greek Orthodox College), founded by the Patriarch Gennadius as a continuation of the University of Constantinople after the Fall of Constantinople.

Works
Rhetorique, Augsburg, 1596

See also

 Greek scholars in the Renaissance

References

1490 deaths
15th-century births
15th-century Byzantine people
15th-century Byzantine writers
15th-century Eastern Orthodox Christians
15th-century Greek people
Byzantine philosophers
Constantinopolitan Greeks
Greek Renaissance humanists
Writers from Thessaloniki
Scholars in Eastern Orthodoxy
15th-century Greek educators